Gautami Tadimalla (born 2 July 1969) is an Indian actress and politician who has worked mainly in Tamil and Telugu, in addition to Malayalam, Hindi, and Kannada films. She was one of the leading South Indian actresses from 1987 to 1998. She is also a television actress, television host, the founder of Life Again Foundation, and a costume designer.

Personal life

Gautami was born in Srikakulam, Andhra Pradesh to T. R. Seshagiri Rao and Vasundhara Devi. Her father was a pioneering radiation oncologist and her mother was a pathologist and diagnostician. Gautami attended Bishop Cotton Girls' School, Bangalore.

Gautami married Sandeep Bhatia, a businessman, in 1998, and the couple have a daughter, Subbulakshmi born in 1999. They later got divorced in 1999.

Gautami was in a relationship with actor Kamal Haasan from 2004 till 2016. In 2016, Gautami had announced on her blog that she had ended her relationship with him. Gautami wrote on her blog: "It is heartbreaking for me to have to say today that I and Mr. Haasan are no longer together. After almost 13 years together, it has been one of the most devastating decisions that I have ever had to make in my life".

She was diagnosed with  breast cancer at the age of 35, and had recovered later.

Film career 

She was introduced to Tamil film industry through Guru Shishyan (1988), a film that starred Rajinikanth and Prabhu. She was most active in Tamil cinema from 1987 to 1998.

Gautami went to GITAM University in Visakhapatnam to pursue engineering. Gautami made her debut in Telugu with the film Dayamayudu (1987). that was produced by her cousin. She then appeared in films like Srinivasa Kalyanam with Venkatesh and Bhanupriya.

Her notable performances in Malayalam films include His Highness Abdullah (1990) with Mohanlal, Daddy (1992) with Arvind Swami Dhruvam (1993) with Mammootty and Ayalathe Adheham (1993) with Jayaram. Her role in Sukrutham (1994) was penned by the writer M. T. Vasudevan Nair. She has acted also in Kannada films Elu Suttina Kote (1987), Chikkejamanru (1992), Cheluva (1997), and in the Hindi movies, Pyar Hua Chori Chori (1991), Aadmi (1993), Janta Ki Adalat (1994), Trimurti (1995), Dhaal (1997) and Haiwan (1998).

Her notable Tamil movies was Apoorva Sagodharargal (1989), Raja Chinna Roja (1989), Panakkaran (1990), Ooru Vittu Ooru Vanthu (1990), Namma Ooru Poovatha (1990), Dharma Durai (1991), Nee Pathi Naan Pathi (1991), Rickshaw Mama (1992), Thevar Magan (1992), Honest Raj (1994), Nammavar (1994), Kuruthipunal (1995) as well as Mani Ratnam's Iruvar (1997). 

She made a guest appearance in the song "Chikku Bukku Railu" with Prabhu Deva in the film Gentleman (1993). Her film Sasanam, featuring Arvind Swami, released in 2006, but it was shot in 1996. She played the lead in the Tamil serial Indira. She had hosted a talk show in Sun TV titled Anbudan. She acted in the serial Abirami which was telecast on Kalaignar TV. She made a comeback to the film industry in the late 2000s as a costume designer for films starring her partner Kamal Haasan. She won the Vijay Award for Best Costume Designer for Dasavathaaram (2008). She went on to style several of her other films, including Vishwaroopam (2013) and Uttama Villain (2015).

After sixteen years, she returned to acting, by starring in the Tamil film Papanasam (2015), in which she was paired with her partner Kamal Haasan, remake of the original Malayalam film, Drishyam. In 2016, his film Manamantha (2016) with Mohanlal, has garnered positive reviews from the audience. She made comeback to Malayalam after 14 years in the horror thriller titled E (2017) playing the lead role. She playing a pivotal character in Thupparivaalan 2 directed and starring Vishal.

Political career 
Gautami is a member of the BJP since 1997. She was BJYM vice president  She joined the party in 1997 under the leadership of LK Advani. She extensively campaigned for Atal Bihari Vajpayee during that period in Andhra, Karnataka and Tamil Nadu. She took a break from politics after her daughter was born. She is back into BJP in 2017. In 2021, she was appointed as in-charge of the Rajapalayam Assembly constituency.

Charity work 
Gautami founded Life Again Foundation (LAF) to help cancer patients. Life Again Foundation has conducted more than 360 motivational camps for cancer patients, cancer awareness campaigns, and food drives. It also conducts Yoga and Alternative Therapy programs. It also periodically conducts health camps to conduct tests that screen for cancer and overall health. LAF also runs 2 Mobile hospitals. It also sponsors under-privileged students for higher education. It runs Supplementary Education Centres and Vocational Training Centres.

Awards and honours

Filmography

References

External links 
 

Actresses in Telugu cinema
Actresses from Andhra Pradesh
Actresses in Tamil cinema
Indian film actresses
Indian costume designers
Living people
Actresses in Malayalam cinema
Filmfare Awards South winners
Telugu actresses
20th-century Indian actresses
21st-century Indian actresses
Actresses in Kannada cinema
People from Srikakulam
Tamil Nadu State Film Awards winners
Indian women comedians
Indian women fashion designers
21st-century Indian designers
21st-century Indian women artists
20th-century Indian designers
20th-century Indian women artists
Indian television actresses
Actresses in Tamil television
Actresses in Malayalam television
Actresses in Hindi cinema
1968 births